Your Big Secret (German: Ihr großes Geheimnis) is a 1918 German silent drama film directed by Joe May and starring Mia May, Käthe Haack and Johannes Riemann.

Cast
Mia May as Tatjana 
Käthe Haack as Klärchen Lehner 
Johannes Riemann as Helmut Karsten 
Hermann Picha as Homeowner Lehner

References

External links

Films of the German Empire
German silent feature films
Films directed by Joe May
German drama films
1918 drama films
UFA GmbH films
German black-and-white films
Silent drama films
1910s German films
1910s German-language films